Paritilla is a corregimiento in Pocrí District, Los Santos Province, Panama with a population of 783 as of 2010. Its population as of 1990 was 977; its population as of 2000 was 840.

References

Corregimientos of Los Santos Province